Janani (Jan) Jananayagam is a British Tamil banking professional, activist and politician. She was an independent candidate for the London region in the 2009 European Parliamentary elections.

Early life
Jan was born in Jaffna, Sri Lanka but spent most of her youth in Nigeria and Zambia where her parents were teachers. Later she and her parents emigrated to the United Kingdom. She studied at the University of Manchester and graduated with distinction in computing and information systems. She later received a master's degree in applied mathematics from Imperial College London and a Master of Business Administration from INSEAD business school.

Professional career 
After a period in computing research and development Jan moved into the banking industry.  She currently works in the London and 
German offices of a leading Italian bank as a project manager.  She is involved in the setting up of e-commerce ventures. Jananayagam has written columns in the Tamil Guardian that focused on Sri Lanka's treatment of Tamils.

European Parliament candidate
Jan stood as an independent candidate for the London region in the 2009 European Parliamentary elections. She did not win a seat, but garnered 2.86% of the vote. The main policies on which she campaigned on were:
 Civil rights and individual freedom
 Financial transparency and effective regulation
 Equality and diversity
 Small businesses and entrepreneurship
 Ethical foreign policy
 Animal welfare

She campaigned against the British National Party.

She had been endorsed by the Oscar-nominated musician Maya Arulpragasam (MIA). MIA has started an online campaign in support of Jan and offered a free song.

Despite winning many votes for an Independent, she did not win a seat against competitive parties. Jan came 8th out of the 19 parties/independents contesting London after receiving 50,014 votes (2.86%). This was more than the combined vote for all other independent candidates across the whole of the UK. Her £5000 deposit was returned, as she got more than the 2.5% threshold in the vote.

Votes received by Jan for each London borough:

References

External links
 *

Year of birth missing (living people)
Living people
British politicians of Sri Lankan descent
British human rights activists
Women human rights activists
British people of Sri Lankan Tamil descent
Sri Lankan emigrants to the United Kingdom
People from Jaffna
INSEAD alumni
British Hindus